Wilhelm Leichum (12 May 1911, Neu-Isenburg, Grand Duchy of Hesse – 19 July 1941, Gorky) was a German athlete who competed mainly in the long jump and 100 metres.

Leichum was born in Hesse. He competed for Germany in the 1936 Summer Olympics held in Berlin, Germany in the 4 x 100 metre relay where he won the bronze medal with his team mates Erich Borchmeyer, Erwin Gillmeister and Gerd Hornberger. He was also 4th in the long jump. He was European Champion in the long jump both in 1934 and 1938.

He was killed in action during World War II in 1941, July 19.

References

1911 births
1941 deaths
People from Neu-Isenburg
Sportspeople from Darmstadt (region)
Athletes (track and field) at the 1936 Summer Olympics
German male sprinters
German male long jumpers
German military personnel killed in World War II
People from the Grand Duchy of Hesse
Olympic bronze medalists for Germany
Olympic athletes of Germany
European Athletics Championships medalists
Medalists at the 1936 Summer Olympics
Olympic bronze medalists in athletics (track and field)